The Zélé was a 74-gun ship of the line of the French Royal Navy. She was funded by a don des vaisseaux donation from the Régisseur général des finances.

Career 
On 6 July 1779, she participated in the Battle of Grenada as a member of the Vanguard. Under Bruyères-Chalabre, she was part of the French blockade during Siege of Savannah in 1779.

In 1781 and 1782, was part of de Grasse's fleet in the naval operations in the American Revolutionary War.  She took part in the Invasion of Tobago in May 1781 and in the Battle of the Chesapeake on 5 September 1781. under Charles-René de Gras-Préville.

In the night of 11 to 12 April 1782, Zélé collided with Ville de Paris, damaging Zélé which had to be taken in tow to repair at Martinique. This precipitated the French disorganisation and subsequent defeat in the Battle of the Saintes later that day.

Zélé was broken up in May 1806.

Sources and references 
 Notes

References

Bibliography
 
 
 
 

External links
 Ships of the line

Ships of the line of the French Navy
Ships built in France
César-class ships of the line
1763 ships
Don des vaisseaux